The  Heathrow Airside Road Tunnel (ART) is a tunnel at Heathrow Airport. It connects the airside roads around Terminals 1, 2 and 3 to those around Terminal 5. The tunnel was opened to traffic in March 2005 and is used only by vehicles with security clearance to drive airside.

The ART was designed and built between 1999 and 2004 by a team of engineers from the BAA (the tunnel's owner), Amec, Laing O'Rourke, Morgan Est-Vinci and Mott MacDonald.

Portals
West portal: 
East portal:

Sources
 Challenging ART for Heathrow, World Tunnelling August 2003, pp. 225–229
 Darby, A., The Airside Road Tunnel, Heathrow Airport, England, Proceedings of the Rapid Excavation & Tunneling Conference, New Orleans, June 2003, pp. 638–647
 Morgan Est project page on T5

External links
 Mott MacDonald page on the Heathrow Airside Road Tunnel
 Engineering the space below Terminal 5, Ingenia magazine, March 2008

Airside Road Tunnel Heathrow Airside Road Tunnel
Tunnels completed in 2004
Road tunnels in England
Transport in the London Borough of Hillingdon
Airside Road Tunnel
Tunnels in London
2004 establishments in England